Ghaggar railway station is a small railway station in Sahibzada Ajit Singh Nagar district, Punjab. Its code is GHG. It serves Ghaggar town near Derabassi and Zirakpur The station consists of two platforms. The platforms are well sheltered. It has good facilities including water and sanitation.

Trains 
Some of the trains that run from Ghaggar are:
 Kalka–Delhi Passenger (unreserved)
 Ambala–Nangal Dam Passenger (unreserved)
 Amb Andaura–Ambala DMU
 Kalka–Ambala Passenger (unreserved)

References

External links
 Trains at Ghaggar India Rail Info
 

Railway stations in Sahibzada Ajit Singh Nagar district
Ambala railway division